Scattergood: Friend of All is an Australian television sitcom which first screened on the ABC in 1975.

Scattergood: Friend of All was originally one episode of the anthology series The Comedy Game which screened in 1971. It was intended that some of the episodes could act as pilots for series. The other successful episodes which led to series were A Nice Day at the Office, Our Man in Canberra and Aunty Jack.

Cast
 Max Cullen as  Scattergood
 Redmond Phillips
 Reg Evans		
 Lex Mitchell		
 Denny Lawrence		
 Lex Marinos

See also
 List of Australian television series

References

External links
 
 Scattergood: Friend of All at Classic Television Australia

1975 Australian television series debuts
1975 Australian television series endings
Australian television sitcoms
Australian Broadcasting Corporation original programming
English-language television shows
Black-and-white Australian television shows